Giacomo Antonio della Torre or Jacopo-Antonio dalla Torre (died 1486) was a Roman Catholic prelate who served as Bishop of Cremona (1476–1486),
Bishop of Parma (1463–1476), Bishop of Modena (1444–1463),
and Bishop of Reggio Emilia (1439–1444).<ref>Di Zio, "DELLA TORRE, Giacomo Antonio".</ref>

Biography
Della Torre was born in the territory of Modena, and held a degree in the Arts, and was a Doctor of Medicine. Because of his intellectual gifts he was a favorite of Pope Eugene IV.

On 16 January 1439, Giacomo Antonio della Torre was appointed by Pope Eugene as Bishop of Reggio Emilia.  On 16 August 1439, he was consecrated bishop by Antonio Bernieri (bishop), Bishop of Lodi, with Delfino della Pergola, Bishop of Parma, and Pier-Simone Brunetti, Auxiliary Bishop of Parma serving as co-consecrators.
 
On 19 October 1444, he was appointed Bishop of Modena by Pope Eugene.

On 24 September 1463, he was transferred to the diocese of Parma by Pope Pius II, at the same time as the Bishop of Parma, Delfino della Pergola, was transferred to Modena.
 
On 15 January 1476, Pope Sixtus IV transferred him to the diocese of Cremona. He served as Bishop of Cremona until his death in 1486.

While bishop, he was the principal co-consecrator of Giacomo de Suressi (Sulixio), Archbishop of Craina (1483).

 References 

Sources and external links

Di Zio, Tiziana. "DELLA TORRE, Giacomo Antonio"  Dizionario Biografico degli Italiani Volume 37 (1989); retrieved: 13 October 2018. 
 (in Latin)''

15th-century Italian Roman Catholic bishops
Bishops appointed by Pope Eugene IV
Bishops appointed by Pope Pius II
Bishops appointed by Pope Sixtus IV
Giacomo Antonio
1486 deaths